Events from the year 1927 in Canada.

Incumbents

Crown 
 Monarch – George V

Federal government 
 Governor General – Freeman Freeman-Thomas, 1st Marquess of Willingdon 
 Prime Minister – William Lyon Mackenzie King
 Chief Justice – Francis Alexander Anglin (Ontario)
 Parliament – 16th

Provincial governments

Lieutenant governors 
Lieutenant Governor of Alberta – William Egbert 
Lieutenant Governor of British Columbia – Robert Randolph Bruce 
Lieutenant Governor of Manitoba – Theodore Arthur Burrows
Lieutenant Governor of New Brunswick – William Frederick Todd 
Lieutenant Governor of Nova Scotia – James Cranswick Tory
Lieutenant Governor of Ontario – Henry Cockshutt (until January 12) then William Donald Ross 
Lieutenant Governor of Prince Edward Island – Frank Richard Heartz 
Lieutenant Governor of Quebec – Narcisse Pérodeau
Lieutenant Governor of Saskatchewan – Henry William Newlands

Premiers 
Premier of Alberta – John Edward Brownlee
Premier of British Columbia – John Oliver (until August 17) then John Duncan MacLean (from August 20)
Premier of Manitoba – John Bracken 
Premier of New Brunswick – John Baxter 
Premier of Nova Scotia – Edgar Nelson Rhodes 
Premier of Ontario – George Howard Ferguson
Premier of Prince Edward Island – James D. Stewart (until August 12) then Albert Charles Saunders 
Premier of Quebec – Louis-Alexandre Taschereau 
Premier of Saskatchewan – James Garfield Gardiner

Territorial governments

Commissioners 
 Gold Commissioner of Yukon – Percy Reid (until November 13) then George A. Jeckell
 Commissioner of Northwest Territories – William Wallace Cory

Events
January 5 – The National Museum of Canada is created.
January 9 – 76 people are killed when a fire breaks out at the Laurier Palace Theatre in Montreal.
March 1 – The location of the boundary between Labrador and Quebec is settled by the Judicial Committee of the Privy Council, accepting the Dominion of Newfoundland's claim rather than Canada's.
May 28 – The Old Age Pensions Act is introduced.
July 1 – Confederation celebration marked by the first cross country radio broadcast.
August 12 – Albert Saunders becomes premier of Prince Edward Island, replacing James D. Stewart.
August 17 – John Oliver, Premier of British Columbia, dies in office.
August 20 – John Duncan MacLean becomes premier of British Columbia.
September 21 – Ten Canadian Pacific Railway cars carrying a valuable cargo of silk goes off the rails near Yale, British Columbia. Five of the cars land in the Fraser River.
October 4 – Worthington mine disaster occurs. 
October 11 – Richard Bedford Bennett, becomes leader of the Conservative Party of Canada.

Arts and literature
Mazo de la Roche publishes Jalna
December 5 – The National Gallery of Canada opened an exhibit featuring the work of Emily Carr, bringing her out of obscurity.

Science and technology
Canadian anthropologist Davidson Black discovered a fossil molar of Peking Man in a cave near Beijing, China
Wallace Rupert Turnbull tested the second design of his variable-pitch propeller, a key development in aviation

Sport 
February 14 – Conn Smythe takes control of the Toronto St. Patricks and renames them to the Toronto Maple Leafs
March 28 – Ontario Hockey Association's Owen Sound Greys win their second Memorial Cup by defeating Thunder Bay Junior Hockey League's Port Arthur West Ends 2 game to 0. All games were played at Arena Gardens in Toronto
April 13 – Ottawa Senators win their 11th and final Stanley Cup by defeating the Boston Bruins 2 game to 0 (with 2 ties). The deciding game was played at the Ottawa Auditorium
November 26 – Toronto Balmy Beach Beachers win their first Grey Cup by defeating the Hamilton Tigers 9 to 6 in the 15th Grey Cup played at Varsity Stadium in Toronto.

Births

January to March
January 1
Calum MacKay, Canadian ice hockey player (d. 2001)
Jean-Paul Mousseau, artist (d. 1991)
January 4 – Paul Desmarais, financier
January 6 – John W. Grace, first Privacy Commissioner of Canada (d. 2009)
January 10 – Gisele MacKenzie, singer (d. 2003)
January 17 – Stan Roberts, politician (d. 1990)
January 24 – Phyllis Lambert, architect and philanthropist
January 25 – Gildas Molgat, politician (d. 2001)
January 28 – Sheila Finestone, politician and Senator (d. 2009)
January 29 – Lewis Urry, chemical engineer and inventor (d. 2004)
January 30 – Sterling Lyon, politician and 17th Premier of Manitoba (d. 2010)
February 11 – Sinclair Stevens, politician
March 3 – William Kurelek, artist and writer (d. 1977)
March 9 – John Beckwith, composer, writer, pianist, teacher and administrator
March 25 – Bill Barilko, ice hockey player (d. 1951)
March 27 – Eugène Philippe LaRocque, Roman Catholic priest (d. 2018)
March 28 – Fernande Saint-Martin, art critic, museologist, semiologist, visual arts theorist and writer (d. 2019)

April to June
April 6 
 E. K. Turner, businessman and educator (d. 2018)
 Dorothy Knowles, artist
April 8 
 Phyllis Webb, poet and broadcaster (d. 2021)
 Lois Miriam Wilson, first female Moderator of the United Church of Canada and Senator
April 13 – Ronald Stewart, businessman and politician (d. 2022)
April 25 – Frances Hyland, actress (d. 2004) 
May 2 –  Budge Wilson, writer (d. 2021)
May 5 – Sylvia Fedoruk, scientist, curler and Lieutenant Governor of Saskatchewan (d. 2012)
May 14 – Frank Miller, politician and 19th Premier of Ontario (d. 2000)
June 3 – George Hislop, gay activist (d. 2005)
June 17 – Jean Robert Beaulé, politician (d. 2005)
June 24 – Fernand Dumont, sociologist, philosopher, theologian and poet (d. 1997)
June 25 – Nora McDermott basketball player, volleyball player, coach and physical education teacher (d. 2013)
June 26 – Robert Kroetsch, novelist, poet and non-fiction writer (d. 2011)
June 29
 Marie Thérèse Killens, politician
 Viola Myers, sprinter (d. 1993)
 Pierre Savard, politician

July to December
July 2 – Fern Villeneuve, aviator (d. 2019)
July 18 – Keith MacDonald, Canadian politician  (d. 2021)
July 20 – Jack Horner, politician and Minister (d. 2004)
July 21 – Hal Hatfield, football player
August 17 – John Alan Beesley, diplomat and civil servant (d. 2009)
September 1 – Chuck Dalton, basketball player, member of Olympic team (1952) (d. 2013)
September 7 – Claire L'Heureux-Dubé, justice of the Supreme Court of Canada
October 3 – Kenojuak Ashevak, artist (d. 2013)
October 14 – Elmer Iseler, choir conductor and choral editor (d. 1998)
October 15 – Peter Pollen, politician (d. 2017)
November 3 – Harrison McCain, businessman (d. 2004)
November 8 – Peter Munk, businessman and philanthropist
November 10
 Gerry Glaude, professional ice hockey defenceman (d. 2017)
Joyce Trimmer, politician and first female mayor of Scarborough, Ontario (d. 2008)
November 17 – Nicholas Taylor, geologist, businessman, politician and Senator (d. 2020)
November 18 – Knowlton Nash, journalist, author and television news anchor (d. 2014)
November 26 – Ernie Coombs, children's entertainer Mr. Dressup (d. 2001)
November 30 – Tod Sloan, ice hockey player (d. 2017)
December 6 – Marcel Pelletier, Canadian ice hockey player (d. 2017)
December 7 – Grant Strate, dancer, choreographer and academic
December 18 – Roméo LeBlanc, politician and 25th Governor General of Canada (d. 2009)
December 24 – Geoffrey Pearson, diplomat (d. 2008)

Deaths

January to June
January 24 – Agnes Maule Machar, author (b. 1837)
February 10 – James Kidd Flemming, businessman, politician and 13th Premier of New Brunswick (b. 1868)
March 8 – James Fisher, politician (b. 1840)
March 16 – Robert Bond, politician and Prime Minister of Newfoundland (b. 1857)
March 30 – Charles Hibbert Tupper, politician (b. 1855)
June 3 – Henry Petty-Fitzmaurice, 5th Marquess of Lansdowne, Governor General of Canada (b. 1845)
June 7 – Edmund James Flynn, politician and Premier of Quebec (b. 1847)

July to December
August 17 – John Oliver, politician and Premier of British Columbia (b. 1856)
November 2 – Charles Augustus Semlin, politician and Premier of British Columbia (b. 1836)
November 5 – Jérémie-Louis Décarie, judge and lawyer (b. 1870)
December 21 – Félix Gatineau, statesman (b. 1857) 
December 31 – William Warren, lawyer, politician, judge and Prime Minister of Newfoundland (b. 1879)

See also
 List of Canadian films

Historical documents
Popular infant care author writes government guide to raising babies, including growth, health, habits, and "character and disposition"

Speaker delivers strongly anti-Catholic commentary at packed Ku Klux Klan meeting in Regina

MP Agnes Macphail calls for government pension coverage for war veterans unable to work

British privy council renders decision on long-disputed Labrador border between Newfoundland and Canada

U.S. border restrictions force Canadian residents working in U.S.A. to qualify for immigration

Illustration: A.Y. Jackson's painting of Mount Robson is among Group of Seven art in Canadian National Railway guide to Jasper National Park

Hunter regrets killing one of Jack Miner's "noble" Canada geese

Son of "dead" man who skippered schooner lost in Lake Ontario gale learns he started life anew in Oklahoma

References

 
Years of the 20th century in Canada
Canada
1927 in North America